1,1-Dihydroxydicyclohexyl peroxide is an organic compound with the formula (C6H10OH)2O2.  It is one of the peroxides derived from the reaction of cyclohexanone and hydrogen peroxide.  Upon treatment with acid and additional peroxide, it converts to the cyclic diperoxide, bis(cyclohexylidene peroxide), (C6H10)2(O2)2.

1,1-Dihydroxydicyclohexyl peroxide is a catalyst for radical-initiated vulcanization.

References 

Organic peroxides
Radical initiators
Organic peroxide explosives
Cyclohexanols